Maxwell Stanley Reed (28 May 1942 – 2 September 2013) was an Australian rules footballer who played with St Kilda in the Victorian Football League (VFL).

Notes

External links 

1942 births
2013 deaths
Australian rules footballers from Victoria (Australia)
St Kilda Football Club players
Cobden Football Club players